Geraldine Mae Sherman (1922–2012) was an American fashion designer of Native American descent, known for creating pieces inspired by the Lakota traditions of the Rosebud Indian Reservation in South Dakota. With the assistance of the Moroccan-born anthropologist Helene Hagan, she established the pioneering Contemporary Lakota Fashions, which produced, exhibited and marketed a variety of garments from the mid-1980s.

Biography
Born on September 8, 1922 near Kyle, South Dakota, Geraldine Mae Sherman was the fourth of the seven children of William Sherman and his wife Victoria, née Hunter. Brought up on the Indian reservation, she graduated from Oglala Community School in Pine Ridge in 1940.

In 1947, she married Calvin T. Cutschall with whom she had several children, mainly after they settled in Rapid City, South Dakota. They divorced in the early 1970s. As a result of her contacts with the St. Isaac Jogues Church in Rapid City, she presented items of women's clothing at exhibitions arranged by the Mahpiya Luta Club in the late 1966s, winning first prize two years in succession.

Thanks to the support and encouragement of the psychologist and anthropologist Helene Hagan, she developed a collection of Lakota fashions which she marketed through her establishment Contemporary Lakota Fashions. In addition to women's clothing, she designed items for clergy-members, including for Pope John Paul II.

Sherman died on November 4, 2012 in Rapid City.

References

1922 births
2012 deaths
Lakota people
Indigenous fashion designers of the Americas
People from Rosebud Indian Reservation, South Dakota
American women artists
American textile designers
People from Oglala Lakota County, South Dakota
American women fashion designers
20th-century Native American women
20th-century Native Americans
21st-century Native American women
21st-century Native Americans
20th-century American women artists
21st-century American women artists
Artists from South Dakota